Wang Pengren is a male former world level badminton player from China.

Career
He specialized in mixed doubles, winning almost all of his significant international titles partnership with Shi Fangjing. Though they had previously won together at the Polish Open in 1985, Wang and Shi were unexpected mixed doubles victors at the 1987 World Championships in Beijing. Proving this achievement to be no fluke, they subsequently captured a number of top-tier events, including the Badminton World Cup (1987, 1988), the Swedish Open (1988), the All-England Championships (1988), the World Badminton Grand Prix (1988), and the French Open (1989). In defense of their world title they were bronze medalists (semifinalists) at the 1989 edition of the IBF World Championships. After this, both soon disappeared from the world circuit.

Notes

Chinese male badminton players
Living people
1965 births
Badminton players from Shanghai
Badminton players at the 1988 Summer Olympics